Texas has a Chinese American population. As of the 2010 U.S. census, it is 0.6% Chinese with over 150,000 living there. Many live in Plano, Houston, and Sugar Land.

After May 1869, a group of Chinese workers in the Western United States began moving to Texas, as there was a demand for labor in the post-American Civil War environment. Railroad companies in particular wanted workers to rebuild their infrastructure.

In 1880, Robertson County had 72 ethnic Chinese, while the other 64 were elsewhere in the state. The largest group of Chinese in the period circa 1869-1889 or so were in that county.

A second group of Chinese immigrants arrived from the West Coast of the United States around 1881, as members of the first group had died or moved away, elsewhere or back to China. In 1890, fourteen Texas counties had ten or more ethnic Chinese. The ethnic Chinese population began to decrease around 1900. In 1910, there were 595 ethnic Chinese, with eleven Texas counties having ten or more ethnic Chinese.

Geography

References

Notes

Further reading
 Brady, Marilyn Dell. The Asian Texans. Texas A&M University Press, 2004. , 9781585443123.

1869 establishments in Texas
Chinese
History of Texas
Chinese-American culture in Texas